Charles Frank (1870–1922) was a Major League Baseball player. He played for the St. Louis Browns in 1893–1894.

Sources

Major League Baseball outfielders
St. Louis Browns (NL) players
Atlanta Crackers managers
Baseball players from Alabama
1870 births
1922 deaths
19th-century baseball players
Mobile Blackbirds players
Memphis Fever Germs players
Toledo White Stockings players
Memphis Lambs players
Memphis Giants players
Minneapolis Millers (baseball) players
Columbus Buckeyes (minor league) players
Columbus Senators players
Grand Rapids Furniture Makers players
St. Paul Apostles players
St. Paul Saints (Western League) players